Carbonera Lighthouse is an active lighthouse located on Punta Mala, La Alcaidesa, Spain, it overlooks the Strait of Gibraltar.

History
The original lighthouse was built in 1588, and later restored in the 18th century and 1989. Its other name is Torre de Punta Mala. There is a small ruin of the Casa de Carbonera (charcoal-maker's house) next to the lighthouse. The beach below is known as Playa Balñario and is classified as a Nude beach.

See also

 List of lighthouses in Spain

References

Lighthouses in Andalusia